Peter Everard Coleman AKC (28 August 1928–27 December 2001) was Bishop of Crediton from 1984 to 1996.

Coleman was educated at the Haileybury and Imperial Service College and King's College London before becoming its chaplain  until 1966.  He married Princess Elisabeth-Donata Reuss of Köstritz (Donata; 8 June 1932 - 24 April 2022) in 1960. They had two sons and two daughters. Following this he was vicar of St Paul's Clifton, then Director of Ordinands in the Diocese of Bristol and finally (before his ordination to the episcopate) Archdeacon of Worcester. In retirement he ministered in the Diocese of Bath and Wells as an assistant bishop until his death.

References

1928 births
People educated at Haileybury and Imperial Service College
Alumni of King's College London
Associates of King's College London
Chaplains of King's College London
Archdeacons of Worcester
Bishops of Crediton
20th-century Church of England bishops
2001 deaths